George Henry Ardley (1897–1927) was an English professional footballer who played as a wing-half for Sunderland.

References

1897 births
1927 deaths
People from Langley Park, County Durham
Footballers from County Durham
English footballers
Association football wing halves
Langley Park F.C. players
Sunderland A.F.C. players
Shildon A.F.C. players
English Football League players